Mark Knowles and Daniel Nestor were the defending champions, but Knowles did not compete this year. Nestor teamed up with Cyril Suk and lost in quarterfinals to Olivier Delaître and Fabrice Santoro.

Todd Woodbridge and Mark Woodforde won the title by defeating Mark Philippoussis and Patrick Rafter 7–6, 4–6, 6–4 in an all-Australian final.

Seeds
The first four seeds received a bye into the second round.

Draw

Finals

Top half

Bottom half

Qualifying

Qualifying seeds

Qualifiers

Qualifying draw

First qualifier

Second qualifier

References

External links
 Official Results Archive (ATP)
 Official Results Archive (ITF)

Doubles